Pieter de Graeff (15 August 1638 – 3 June 1707), was a member of the De Graeff-family from the Dutch Golden Age. He was an Amsterdam Regent during the late 1660s and the early 1670s, and held the titles as Lord of the semi-sovereign Fief Zuid-Polsbroek and 19.th Lord of the Free and high Fief Ilpendam and Purmerland. De Graeff was a member of a family of regents who belonged to the republican political movement also referred to as the ‘state oriented’, as opposed to the Royalists.

Biography

Family De Graeff

De Graeff was born in Amsterdam as son of the Amsterdam regent Cornelis de Graeff and Catharina Hooft, and older brother of Jacob de Graeff.

Both, Pieters father Cornelis and his uncle Andries de Graeff, were very critical of the Orange family's influence. Together with the Republican political leader Grand Pensionary Johan de Witt, the De Graeff-family strived for the abolition of stadtholdership. They desired the full sovereignty of the individual regions in a form in which the Republic of the United Seven Netherlands was not ruled by a single person. Instead of a sovereign (or stadtholder) the political and military power was lodged with the States General and with the regents of the cities in Holland.

During the two decades the De Graeff family had a leading role in the Amsterdam administration, the city was at the peak of its political power. This period was also referred to by Republicans as the ‘Ware Vrijheid’ (True Freedom). It was the First Stadtholderless Period which lasted from 1650 to 1672. During these twenty years, the regents from Holland and in particular those of Amsterdam, controlled the republic. The city was flush with self-confidence and liked to compare itself to the famous Republic of Rome. Even without a stadtholder, things seemed to be going well for the Republic and its regents both politically and economically.

Coat of arms

The coat of arms of Pieter de Graeff is quartered with a heart shield and since 1678 it shows the following symbols:
 heart shield shows the three silver rhombuses on red (originally from the family Van Woerdern van Vliet) of the High Lordship Zuid-Polsbroek
 field 1 (left above) shows the silver shovel on red of their paternal ancestors, the Herren von Graben
 field 2 (right above) shows the silver swan on blue of the Fief Vredenhof [or that one (Waterland) of their maternal ancestors, the De Grebber]
 field 3 (left below) shows the silver goose in blue of Purmerland (High Lordship Purmerland and Ilpendam)
 field 4 (right below) shows the red and black lions on gold (the arms of the County of Holland) for Ilpendam (High Lordship Purmerland and Ilpendam) above a blue area
 shield holders are two silver swans
 helmet covers in red and silver
 helm adornment shows an upright silver spade with ostrich feathers (Herren von Graben)
 motto: MORS SCEPTRA LIGONIBUS AEQUAT (DEATH MAKES SEPTRES AND HOES EQUAL)

Early years, marriage and offspring

In 1655, De Graeff went together with Joan Huydecoper I and his eldest son Joan on a diplomatic mission to the Prince-elector Frederick William of Brandenburg, to look for support against the war with Sweden.

During the summers the family spent a lot of their time at the Palace Soestdijk, and the brothers De Graeff played with the young William III of Orange – who later became King of England, Scotland and Ireland and stadtholder of the United Provinces of the Netherlands – at the lake and woods at Soestdijk.

After De Graeff did a Grand Tour through France and England, he married his niece Jacoba Bicker, sister of Wendela Bicker, who married Johan de Witt. The protagonists of the patriciate were closely related, and the couple Pieter and Jacoba were also cousins of the brothers Johan and Cornelis de Witt. Joost van den Vondel wrote a poem to Pieter and Jacoba's marriage at De Graeff's castle Ilpenstein.

The couple had three children:
 Cornelis de Graeff (1671–1719), Lord of Purmerland and Ilpendam, canon in the cathedral chapter of St. Pieter in Utrecht
 Johan de Graeff (1673–1714), Lord of Zuid-Polsbroek, Purmerland and Ilpendam, Amsterdam regent
 Agneta de Graeff, married Jan Baptiste de Hochepied; she owned the cityhouse "Korte Vijverberg 3" in The Hague, the current cabinet of the King

Career
In 1662, De Graeff became a member of the vroedschap of the City of Amsterdam. In 1664, after the death of his father Cornelis, he became a chief administrator of the VOC. During the 1660s De Graeff became one of the guardians from William III of Orange.

De Graeff was also an advisor and a close friend to Johan De Witt, and after De Witts death in the rampjaar 1672 he became the guardian over his five children, including Johan de Witt Jr. After the death of the brothers De Witt and the raise of the House of Orange and Gillis Valckenier, Pieter, his uncle Andries de Graeff and his nephew Lambert Reynst lost their political positions.

De Graeff remained only the function of a chief bewindhebber of the VOC, which he held until his. Between the years 1671 and 1678 Pieter, who increasingly emerged as one of the leaders of the VOC, worked closely with Joan Maetsuycker, the governor-general of the Dutch East Indies.

In 1674, he had active cash assets of 130,000 guilders, making him one of the 250 richest people of the Dutch Golden Age.

Art and lifestyle

Like his father Cornelis, Pieter was also a man who surrounded himself with art and beauty. He was an art collector and patron to the artists Gerard Ter Borch, Jan Lievens, Karel Dujardin, Caspar Netscher and the poet Joost van den Vondel. C. W. Fock of the University of Leiden describes in her work – Het stempel van de bewoner – Pieter de Graeffs art-collection and lifestyle. He stand also in close correspondence to Johan de Witt, Jacob Boreel, Van den Vondel, the painter Jan Lievens and the mathematician, astronomer and physicist Christiaan Huygens.
 
From Pieter de Graeff diaries have been preserved. He made several notes on negotiations and payments from his possessions. He encountered some problems with the famous graphical artist Romeyn de Hooghe, who was going to draw an artistic map of De Graeffs estate Valkenburg. Besides he had some maps coloured by the artist David Reerigh, who also coloured several maps of the Hoogheemraadschap of Rijnland of 1687.

De Graeff also filled forty almanacs, or some 1600 pages, between 1664 and 1706.

De Graeff died on 3 June 1707; his tomb chapel is to be found in the Oude Kerk at Amsterdam.

Noble titles

Notes

Literature
 Zandvliet, Kees (2006) De 250 rijksten van de Gouden Eeuw: kapitaal, macht, familie en levensstijl blz. 93 t/m 94, uitg. Nieuw Amsterdam, Amsterdam, 
 Burke, P. (1994) Venice and Amsterdam. A study of seventeenth-century élites.
 Graeff, P. De (P. de Graeff Gerritsz en Dirk de Graeff van Polsbroek) Genealogie van de familie De Graeff van Polsbroek Amsterdam 1882, Antiquariaat A.G. van der Steur
 Bruijn, J. H. De Genealogie van het geslacht De Graeff van Polsbroek 1529/1827 Antiquariaat A.G. van der Steur
 Moelker, H.P. De heerlijkheid Purmerland en Ilpendam (1978 Purmerend)

External links

 Biographie Pieter de Graeff – Nieuw Nederlandsch biografisch woordenboek. Deel 2
 Biographie Pieter de Graeff – Nieuw Nederlandsch biografisch woordenboek. Deel 7
 Pieter de Graeff by Caspar Netscher, Rijksmuseum Amsterdam
 (nl) Vondels Vers to Pieter de Graeff

1638 births
1707 deaths
Dutch nobility
17th-century Dutch politicians
Pieter, de Graeff
Aldermen of Amsterdam
Lords of Zuid-Polsbroek
Lords of Purmerland and Ilpendam
Administrators of the Dutch East India Company
Burials at the Oude Kerk, Amsterdam